Ronald Martin Hainsey (born March 24, 1981) is an American former professional ice hockey defenseman. He played seventeen years in the NHL for the Montreal Canadiens, Columbus Blue Jackets, Atlanta Thrashers/Winnipeg Jets, Carolina Hurricanes, Pittsburgh Penguins, Toronto Maple Leafs and the Ottawa Senators, playing over 1,100 career NHL games.

Hainsey played in the NHL for nearly 16 years (907 games) before playing on a team that made the playoffs, longer than any other player in league history beating the previous record of 799 games held by Olli Jokinen. He then won the Stanley Cup with the Penguins in his debut playoff appearance, finishing second in ice time for the playoffs in place of the injured Kris Letang.

Early life 
Hainsey was born on March 24, 1981 in Bolton, Connecticut to Marty and Kerry Hainsey. He learned how to skate at the Bolton Ice Palace.

Playing career

Early career 
As a youth, Hainsey played in the 1995 Quebec International Pee-Wee Hockey Tournament with a minor ice hockey team from Springfield, Massachusetts.

Hainsey was drafted in the first round, 13th overall, by the Montreal Canadiens in the 2000 NHL Entry Draft, from the University of Massachusetts Lowell (1999-2001) of the Hockey East NCAA conference. He began his professional career with Montreal's American Hockey League (AHL) affiliates, the Quebec Citadelles and Hamilton Bulldogs, and played in the Calder Cup finals against the Houston Aeros.

Columbus Blue Jackets 
After spending three seasons with the Canadiens organization, Hainsey was claimed off waivers on November 29, 2005, by the Columbus Blue Jackets, where he established himself as a leading two-way defenseman.

Atlanta Thrashers / Winnipeg Jets 
On July 2, 2008, as a free agent, Hainsey signed a five-year, $22.5 million contract with the Atlanta Thrashers. He recorded 6 goals and 33 assists in his first season in Atlanta. He would go on to record 45 points in the next two seasons with the Thrashers. After their relocation to Winnipeg, Manitoba, to become the Winnipeg Jets to start the 2011–12 season, Hainsey recorded 10 assists in 56 games.

Hainsey also played a role in the negotiations of the 2012–13 NHL lockout. After a day of marathon bargaining sessions on December 5, 2012, Hainsey emerged to tell the media that both sides planned to meet again the next day.

Carolina Hurricanes 
On September 12, 2013, Hainsey signed a one-year, $2 million contract with the Carolina Hurricanes after the team announced that a defenseman Joni Pitkänen would miss the season due to injury. On June 24, 2014, Hainsey signed a new three-year, $8.5 million contract with the Hurricanes.

Pittsburgh Penguins 
On February 23, 2017, Hainsey, in the final year of his contract, was traded to the Pittsburgh Penguins in exchange for a second-round pick in the 2017 NHL Entry Draft and Danny Kristo. It was the first time that he had been traded in his career. It was with the Penguins that on April 12, 2017, after 907 career NHL games and surpassing Olli Jokinen's previous playoff games drought "record", Hainsey made his Stanley Cup playoff debut, doing so against the Columbus Blue Jackets. Hainsey and the Penguins went on to win the Stanley Cup over the Nashville Predators in the Finals. He was the first player captain Sidney Crosby handed the trophy to, following the victory.

Toronto Maple Leafs 
On July 1, 2017, Hainsey signed a two-year, $6 million contract with the Toronto Maple Leafs. He was signed to replace the departing Matt Hunwick, who coincidentally signed with the Penguins that same day. Hainsey made his season debut playing alongside Morgan Rielly.

On November 1, 2018, Hainsey played in his 1,000 career NHL game.

Ottawa Senators 
On July 1, 2019, Hainsey signed a one-year, $3.5 million contract with the Ottawa Senators. He chose to wear number 81.

Career statistics

Regular season and playoffs

International

Awards and honors

Personal life
Hainsey and his wife Hayley have three children. Hainsey met his wife in Hamilton, Ontario, when he was playing for the Hamilton Bulldogs.

References

External links
 

1981 births
Living people
American expatriate ice hockey players in Canada
American men's ice hockey defensemen
Atlanta Thrashers players
Carolina Hurricanes players
Columbus Blue Jackets players
Hamilton Bulldogs (AHL) players
Ice hockey players from Connecticut
Montreal Canadiens draft picks
Montreal Canadiens players
National Hockey League first-round draft picks
Ottawa Senators players
People from Bolton, Connecticut
Pittsburgh Penguins players
Quebec Citadelles players
Stanley Cup champions
Toronto Maple Leafs players
UMass Lowell River Hawks men's ice hockey players
USA Hockey National Team Development Program players
Winnipeg Jets players
AHCA Division I men's ice hockey All-Americans